Phước Long is a district-level town in Bình Phước Province, in the Southeast region of Vietnam on the border with Cambodia. It was the site of the Battle of Phước Long, a decisive battle during the Vietnam War.

The current administrative unit was established in 2009 from part of former Phước Long District, including Thác Mơ township and Phước Bình township. It covers 118.83 km2 and has a population of 50,019 as of 2009. Bù Gia Mập District was established from the other part of Phước Long District.

The town has seven subdivisions, including Long Thủy, Thác Mơ, Sơn Giang, Phước Bình, Long Phước, and the communes of Long Giang and Phước Tín.

It borders Bù Đăng District to the east, Bù Gia Mập District to the north and Phú Riềng District to the west and south.

Climate

References

Districts of Bình Phước province
County-level towns in Vietnam